James Joseph McCabe (17 September 1918 – July 1989) was a Northern Irish footballer who played as a wing half.

Career
Born in Draperstown, McCabe played for Billingham Synthonia, South Bank St Peters, Middlesbrough, Leeds United and Peterborough United. He also earned six caps for the Northern Ireland national team.

References

1918 births
1989 deaths
Association footballers from Northern Ireland
Northern Ireland international footballers
Billingham Synthonia F.C. players
South Bank St Peters F.C. players
Middlesbrough F.C. players
Leeds United F.C. players
Peterborough United F.C. players
English Football League players
Midland Football League players
Association football wing halves
Expatriate association footballers from Northern Ireland
Expatriate footballers in England